East Main Street Historic District is a national historic district located at Brevard, Transylvania County, North Carolina.  It encompasses 14 contributing buildings, 1 contributing structure, and 1 contributing site in a predominantly residential section of Brevard.  The district developed between about 1900 and 1959 and includes notable examples of Colonial Revival and Bungalow / American Craftsman style architecture. Located in the district are the separately listed St. Philip's Episcopal Church, Silvermont, William Breese, Jr., House, Charles E. Orr House, Royal and Louise Morrow House, and Max and Claire Brombacher House.  Other notable buildings include the Lankford-Cleveland House (c. 1858, 1900), Brevard-Davidson River Presbyterian Church (1956, 1965, 1996), White House (c. 1900), Wyke-Barclay House (1905), and Carrier-Plummer House (1914).

It was listed on the National Register of Historic Places in 2009.

Gallery

References

Historic districts on the National Register of Historic Places in North Carolina
Colonial Revival architecture in North Carolina
Buildings and structures in Transylvania County, North Carolina
National Register of Historic Places in Transylvania County, North Carolina